The 2012 McDonald's All-American Girls Game is an All-star basketball game that was played on March 28, 2011 at the United Center in Chicago, Illinois, home of the Chicago Bulls. The game's rosters featured the best and most highly recruited high school girls graduating in 2012.  The game is the 11th annual version of the McDonald's All-American Game first played in 2002. The West team won 79–78.

2012 Game
The East team dominated the first half, achieving a lead of 16 points at one time. The West team fought back, but still trailed by eleven points at the half. In the second half, the West team continued to cut into the lead, and a layup by Morgan Tuck produced a tie at 50 points each early in the second half. Tuck ended the game with 18 points, but West's Nirra Fields, the first player ever to make a McDonald's All-American roster from Canada, ended the game with 20 points to lead all scorers. However, the West was unable to take the lead. The score was tied at 78 all, when East held for a final shot by Alexis Prince, but the shot did not go in and the buzzer sounded. The players headed to their benches, expecting to get ready for the first ever overtime in a McDonald's girls game. However, a late whistle had been blown and the referees decided that a foul on Bashaara Graves had occurred before the end of regulation. Three tenths of a second were put back on the game clock, and Graves went to the line with a one-and-one opportunity. She hit the first, and missed the second, but there was not enough time left for a subsequent play, so the East held on for the 79–78 win. Bashaara Graves was named the Tournament MVP.

2012 East Roster
Source:

2012 West Roster
Source:

Coaches
The East team was coached by:
 Head Coach Anne Long of Spring Valley High School (Columbia, South Carolina)
 Assistant coach Doretha Garland of Spring Valley High School (Columbia, South Carolina)
 Assistant coach Gregory Bauldrick of Spring Valley High School (Columbia, South Carolina)

The West team was coached by:
 Head Coach Tanya Johnson of Zion-Benton High School (Zion, Illinois)
 Assistant coach Mary Just of Loyola Academy in Wilmette, Illinois
 Assistant coach Ellen O’Brien of Downers Grove South High School in Downers Grove, Illinois

All-American Week

Schedule 

 Monday, March 26: Powerade Jamfest
 Slam Dunk Contest
 Three-Point Shoot-out
 Timed Basketball Skills Competition
 Wednesday, March 28: Girls All-American Game

Contest Winners
 Breanna Stewart earned perfect scores on two dunks in the first round to advance to the finals. However, Shabazz Muhammad won in the finals.
 Jordan Jones won the skills competition
 Morgan Tuck won the three point shooting competition

See also
2012 McDonald's All-American Boys Game

References

External links
McDonald's All-American on the web

2012 in American women's basketball
2012